Elections to the Third Odisha Legislative Assembly were held 1961.

Constituencies
The elections were held for 140 constituencies, of which 25 were reserved for Scheduled Castes, 29 for Scheduled Tribes and 86 unreserved.

Contesting parties
There are three national parties (the Communist Party of India, Congress and the Praja Socialist Party), one state party (Ganatantra Parishad), one registered unrecognised party (Jharkhand Party) and some Independent Politicians. All took part in this assembly election. The Congress party emerged again as the winner by winning 58% of the seats with a vote share of 43.28%. The post of Chief Minister saw successive replacements during this period.Biju Patnaik became the  Chief Minister of Odisha and remained in power till 1963, before being replaced by Biren Mitra, and finally by Sadashiva Tripathy.

Results

!colspan=10|
|- style="background-color:#E9E9E9; text-align:center;"
! colspan=2|Party !! Flag !! Seats  Contested !! Won !! Net Change  in seats !! % of  Seats
! Votes !! Vote % !! Change in vote %
|- style="background: #90EE90;"
| 
| style="text-align:left;" |Indian National Congress
| 
| 140 || 82 ||  26 || 58.57 || 12,69,000 || 43.28 ||  5.02
|-
|
|
| 121 || 37 ||  14 || 26.42 || 6,55,099 || 27.23 ||  1.51
|-
| 
| style="text-align:left;" |Praja Socialist Party
|
| 43 || 10 ||  1 || 7.14 || 3,22,305 || 30.43 ||  20.03
|-
| 
| style="text-align:left;" |Communist Party of India
| 
| 35 || 4 ||  5 || 3.57 || 2,33,971 || 27.32 ||  18.92
|-
| 
| style="text-align:left;" |Jharkhand Party
| 
| 9 || 0 || "New" || 0 || 25,602 || 13.57 || "New"
|-
| 
|
| 187 || 7 ||  6 || 5 || 4,26,302 || 20.89 || N/A
|- class="unsortable" style="background-color:#E9E9E9"
! colspan = 3|
! style="text-align:center;" |Total Seats !! 140 ( 0) !! style="text-align:center;" |Voters !! 85,51,743 !! style="text-align:center;" |Turnout !! colspan = 2|31,27,245 (36.57%)
|}

Elected members

References

State Assembly elections in Odisha
1961 elections in India